Kostas Kaiafas (born 22 September 1974 in Nicosia) is Cypriot former football player and manager.

As a player, he was a midfielder for Omonia and Alki Larnaca. He was the captain of Omonia and the second longest servant in the history of the club, only five appearances short of becoming Omonoia's all-time record holder.

Playing career
Kaiafas came through the AC Omonia academies, playing at first as a right midfielder but then moving to the centre as a defensive midfielder. 2008–2009 was his last season with Omonia, as manager Takis Lemonis let him know that he is no longer included in his squad, and decided to announce his retirement from the team in June 2009. His final game with Omonia was a friendly match against the Lithuanian champions Ekranas, on 7 July 2009.

Although, later he came out of retirement and signed a contract with Alki, a team from Larnaca, that was playing in the Cypriot Second Division during the season 2009–10. He played a major role and captain the team to the league championship and promotion to First Division.

During 2010–11, he became the first and only member of the Kaiafas family, to play against Omonia, on 18 September 2010, despite having said that he never wishes to do so. The match was held at Antonis Papadopoulos Stadium, and despite playing as opponent, Kaiafas was very well accepted by Omonia fans.

In the same season, Kaiafas was a key figure for Alki, but on 29 November 2010 he was involved in an infamous incident which attracted headlines and controversy in Cyprus. In a home match against Ermis Aradippou, he was sent off for pushing and swearing at the referee, after the away team scored the winning goal. Kaiafas was suspended for six months, which ruled him out of first team action, resulting to an inglorious end to his career.

Managerial career
Immediately after Kaiafas ended his career as football player, he took over Alki as manager, however not being holder of the UEFA Pro Licence, he was reported as assistant of Radmilo Ivančević. The duo stayed at Alki until they resigned at 3 December 2012.

Later in the same season (2012/13), Kaiafas was appointed on 4 April 2013, as first manager for Alki Larnaca. After terrible season with Alki during 2013/14, due to the heavy financial problems the club was facing, Kaiafas returned to Omonia on 12 March 2014, taking over as manager.

Personal life
He is the son of Sotiris Kaiafas, winner of 1975/76 European Golden Boot.

Omonia statistics

 Kaiafas' first league game was on 18 January 1992 against Alki. Omonia won 2–0 and he scored the second goal, the first of his career. His last game was on 2 May 2009 against Anorthosis. Omonia won 1–0 and he scored the winning goal, the last of his career.
 Kaiafas' first international appearance was a friendly match against Greece on 19 August 1997 in Heraklion. His first and only goal was scored on 2 February 1998 during a friendly match against Slovenia, which Cyprus won 1–0. His last game with Cyprus was on 17 November 2004 in a defeat against Israel.
 Kaiafas totalled 498 appearances with Omonia, only five behind the all-time record owned by Andreas Kanaris with 503 appearances. He did however overtake his father, Sotiris Kaiafas, who made 476 appearances for the club.

Honours

 Cypriot Championship (3): 1993, 2001, 2003
 Cypriot Cup (4): 1991, 1994, 2000, 2005
 Cyprus FA Shield (4): 1991, 1994, 2001, 2005
 Football Player of the Year : 2003 (awarded by Cyprus Sports Journalists)

References

External links
 
 http://www.footballdatabase.eu/football.joueurs.kostas.kaiafas.3695.en.html Kostas Kaiafas] at Footballdatabase

1974 births
Living people
Cypriot footballers
Cyprus international footballers
AC Omonia players
Alki Larnaca FC players
Cypriot First Division players
Association football midfielders
Sportspeople from Nicosia
Cypriot football managers
Alki Larnaca FC managers
AC Omonia managers
Ermis Aradippou FC managers